Lauren Kobayashi Riihimaki (born August 11, 1993) is a Canadian YouTuber known for her video content on the LaurDIY YouTube channel as well as her vlog and podcast content on the LaurDIY Vlogs and WILD 'TIL 9 channels, respectively. As of January 2022, LaurDIY has over 8.5 million subscribers, and LaurDIY Vlogs and WILD 'TIL 9 have a combined 535,000 subscribers.

Career 
Riihimaki began posting DIY tutorial videos on her blog in her first year of university in Toronto. She first joined YouTube on December 1, 2011, originally to post her sewing videos on the platform. In 2015, she graduated from Toronto Metropolitan University (previously Ryerson University) with a degree in graphic communications management. She won a Shorty Award in the "House & Home" category at the tenth annual ceremony. She also won a Streamy Award in the "Lifestyle" category at the Awards' debut ceremony in 2017. In the same year, her web series Served By LaurDIY premiered on Facebook Watch.

In 2017, Riihimaki appeared as The Engineer, in season 2 of the YouTube Premium series, Escape the Night, created by Joey Graceffa.

In 2019, Riihimaki was announced to host and executive produce a future HBO Max competition series called Craftopia.

Personal life 
Riihimaki is of Finnish and Ukrainian descent through her father (from whom she inherited her Finnish last name), and of Japanese descent through her mother.

Riihimaki dated Sebastian "Baz" Morris from 2010 to 2015, with the pair remaining friends after they split. Morris died in late May 2020. She started dating fellow YouTuber Alexander "Alex" Burriss, also known as Alex Wassabi on YouTube, in 2015. They broke up in September 2018. Lauren has repeatedly mentioned that they had issues with commitment throughout the relationship.

In 2019, Riihimaki began dating singer and entrepreneur Jeremy Lewis. They met for the first time when she was filming the "Roast Yourself Rap" that was popular in 2015. He worked with her to create her video. She recounts in her podcast (Wild Til 9) that she and her assistant initially thought he was gay. 
 In December 2022, Riihimaki and Lewis publicized their engagement on social media.  

She has a dog named Moose, a Miniature Bull Terrier, which she adopted in 2017.

References

External links

1993 births
Canadian bloggers
Canadian people of Finnish descent
Canadian people of Japanese descent
Canadian people of Ukrainian descent
Canadian YouTubers
DIY YouTubers
Living people
People from St. Catharines
Toronto Metropolitan University alumni
Canadian women bloggers
Women video bloggers